The European Piano Competition Bremen (German: Europäischer Klavierwettbewerb Bremen, also known as the Bremer Klavierwettbewerb) is an international piano competition held every 2 years in Bremen. It was founded in 1987 by Radio Bremen. The competition is open to pianists from all over Europe, including the musicians from CIS states, Turkey and Israel.

Due to its high artistic requirements and esteemed jury, the European Piano Competition Bremen gained a reputable position among international competitions since its inception. The Competition is organized by Radio Bremen, the Sparkasse Bremen, the Glocke, the Sendesaal Bremen and the Bremen Philharmonic Orchestra. From the very beginning competition has always been overseen by the current Minister for Foreign of Germany.

List of winners 
Source.

  Andreas Woyke (1987)
  Manfred Kratzer (1989)
  Nadja Rubanenko and  Daniel Gortler, jointly (1991)
  Cédric Tiberghien and  Igor Kamenz, jointly (1993)
  Filippo Gamba (1995)
  Peter Laul (1997)
  Emre Elivar and  Alexandre Pirojenko, jointly (1999)
  Eugene Mursky (2001)
  Julian Gorus (2003)
  David Meier (2005)
  Yana Vasilyeva (2007)
  Violetta Khachikyan (2009)
  Jamie Bergin (2012)
 Stanislav Khegai and  Jean-Paul Gasparian, jointly (2014)
  Elizaveta Ukrainskaia (2016)
  Marek Kozák (2018)
  Valère Burnon (2021)

Jury 

2021
 Konstanze Eickhorst, Germany – Chair
 Ian Fountain, United Kingdom
 Andreas Groethuysen, Germany
 Violetta Khachikyan, Russia
 Matthias Kornemann, Germany
 Gülsin Onay, Turkey
 Erik Tawaststjerna, Finland

2018
 Konstanze Eickhorst, Germany – Chair 
 Olivier Gardon, France
 Klaus Hellwig, Germany
 Elza Kolodin, Poland
 Jevgeny Koroliov, Russia
 Peter Laul, Russia
 Florian Ludwig, Germany

2016
 Konstanze Eickhorst, Germany – Chair
 Boris Bloch, Ukraine
 Finghin Collins, Ireland
 Ewa Kupiec, Poland
 Piers Lane, Australia
 David Meier, Germany
 Mitsuko Shirai, Japan

2014
 Konstanze Eickhorst, Germany – Chair
 Hamish Milne, United Kingdom
 Eugene Mursky, Berlin
 Alfredo Perl, Chile
 Catherine Rückwardt, USA
 Henri Sigfridsson, Finland
 Tamas Vesmas, Romania

 2012
 Konstanze Eickhorst, Germany – Chair
 Aquiles Delle Vigne, Argentina
 Gerald Fauth, Germany
 Julian Gorus, Bulgaria
 Karen Kamensek, Chicago
 Jonathan Plowright, United Kingdom
 Nina Tichman, New York

 2009
 Konstanze Eickhorst, Germany – Chair
 Peter Cossé, Austria
 Julian Gorus, Bulgaria
 Emanuel Krasovsky, Israel
 Gitti Pirner, Germany
 Matti Raekallio, Finland
 Maria Tipo, Italy

 2007
 Konstanze Eickhorst, Germany – Chair
 Pi-Hsien Chen, Taiwan
 Homero Francesch, Switzerland
 Filippo Gamba, Italy
 Kalle Randalu, Estonia
 Wilfried Schäper, Germany
 Nina Tichman, USA

 2005
 Peter Schilbach, Germany – Chair
 Peter Cossé, Austria
 András Hamary, Hungary
 Heinz Medjimorec, Austria
 Gülsin Onay, Turkey
 Cécile Ousset, France
 Begoña Uriarte, Spain

 2003
 Peter Schilbach, Germany – Chair
 Peter Cossé, Austria
 Ewa Kupiec, Poland
 Nikolaus Lahusen, Germany
 Maria Tipo, Italy
 Begoña Uriarte, Spain
 Arie Vardi, Israel

 2001
 Jürgen Meyer-Josten, Germany – Chair
 Konstanze Eickhorst, Germany
 Pi-Hsien Chen, Taiwan
 Heinz Medjimorec, Austria
 Anne Queffélec, France
 Einar Steen-Nokleberg, Norway
 Kurt Seibert, Germany

 1999
 Peter Schilbach, Germany – Chair
 Peter Cossé, Austria
 Valentin Gheorghiu, Romania
 Cécile Ousset, France
 Peter Rösel, Germany
 Maria Tipo, Italy
 Begoña Uriarte, Spain

 1997
 Jürgen Meyer-Josten, Germany – Chair
 Peter Cossé, Austria
 Valentin Gheorghiu, Romania
 Cécile Ousset, France
 Kurt Seibert, Germany
 Einar Steen-Nökleberg, Norway
 Begoña Uriarte, Spain

 1995
 Peter Schilbach, Germany – Chair
 Maria Tipo, Italy
 Nina Tichman, USA
 Gülsin Onay, Turkey
 Catherine Vickers, Canada
 Homero Francesch, Uruguay
 Roland Keller, Germany

 1993
 Jürgen Meyer-Josten, Germany – Chair
 Kurt Bauer, Germany
 Bernhard Ebert, Germany
 Gerhard Erber, Germany
 Valentin Gheorghiu, Romania
 Renate Kretschmar-Fischer, Germany
 Gülsin Onay, Turkey
 Klaus Schilde, Germany

 1991
 Peter Schilbach, Germany – Chair
 Volker Banfield, Germany
 Karl Betz, Germany
 Valentin Gheorghiu, Romania
 Gitti Pirner, Germany
 Annerose Schmidt, Germany
 Arie Vardi, Israel
 Dinorah Varsi, Switzerland

 1989
 Klaus Bernbacher, West Germany – Chair
 Pavel Gililov, USSR
 Eliza Hansen, West Germany
 Margarita Höhenrieder, West Germany
 Detlef Kraus, West Germany
 Annerose Schmidt, GDR

 1987
 Klaus Bernbacher, West Germany – Chair
 Bernhard Ebert, West Germany
 Eliza Hansen, West Germany
 Germaine Mounier, France
 Kurt Seibert, West Germany
 Janos Solyom, Sweden

References

External links 
 Official website of the European Piano Competition Bremen

Piano competitions
Music competitions
Classical music awards
Culture in Bremen (city)
1987 establishments in West Germany
Recurring events established in 1987
Organisations based in Bremen (city)